Dafydd Nanmor (fl. 1450 – 1490) was a Welsh language poet born at Nanmor (or Nantmor), in Gwynedd, north-west Wales. He is one of the most significant poets of this period.

It is said that he was exiled to south Wales for overstepping the mark in his poetry (he sang a poem to a married local woman) and spent the rest of his life outside Gwynedd. His work was seen to have particular significance by the twentieth-century critic Saunders Lewis. Lewis saw him a poet of philosophy who praised the ideal ruler as he praised his patrons who saw that within the Welsh tradition all who had privilege and power also had responsibilities towards family, community and nation.

It is believed that Rhys Nanmor was a bardic student of his.

Bibliography
Thomas Roberts and Ifor Williams, The Poetical Works of Dafydd Nanmor (Cardiff, 1923)

External links
 Biography of Dafydd Nanmor
 "Gwallt Llio" (in Welsh)

Welsh-language poets
People from Gwynedd
15th-century Welsh poets